"Priscilla" is a 1956 song written by Eddie Cooley, which was a hit with his band The Dimples.

The song was covered by:
Frankie Vaughan with Wally Stott and his Orchestra and Chorus 1957	
Buddy Lucas	1957 
Dave Burgess and the Toppers 1957
The Four Jones Boys 1956 
Gus Backus	1961 
Julius La Rosa 1956 
Kevin Young	1961 
Les Brown and his Band of Renown 1956 
The Mercuries 1957

References

1956 songs
Songs written by Eddie Cooley